Spain's american football cup 2013 was the 18th edition of the Cup.

The six LNFA Elite teams entered the competition. L'Hospitalet Pioners and Rivas Osos, as champions and runners-up of last season LNFA Elite, received a bye to the semifinals. The quarter-finals were played on November 11 and November 18. The semifinals will be played on December 2.

L'Hospitalet Pioners are the current title holders.

Copa de España de Fútbol Americano